Ferdinandovac is a municipality in the Koprivnica-Križevci County in Croatia. According to the 2011 census, there are 1,750 inhabitants in the area.

History
In the late 19th century and early 20th century, Ferdinandovac was part of the Bjelovar-Križevci County of the Kingdom of Croatia-Slavonia.

References

Municipalities of Croatia
Populated places in Koprivnica-Križevci County